Mojave Moon is a 1996 American road movie. It stars Danny Aiello, Anne Archer, Michael Biehn, Angelina Jolie and Jack Noseworthy. The film was written by Leonard Glasser and directed by Kevin Dowling.

Plot
Al McCord is hanging out at his favourite restaurant when he meets an attractive young woman, Ellie, who is looking for a ride from the city into the Mojave Desert, where her mother Julie lives. Al discovers romance with the free-spirited Julie despite the nearby presence of her boyfriend Boyd, who seems likely to go berserk at any moment. Strange events follow and it's up to Al to find an explanation.

In the desert, Al's car develops a flat tire. He opens the trunk and discovers an apparent dead body (Ellie's boyfriend Kaiser, whom Al had not yet been aware of). Al heads to a gas station for repairs, following a near run-in with a highway patrolman, when he is interrupted by an attempted robbery. The confusion created by the gun-happy gas station worker allows Al to escape unhurt.

Back home, Al is visited by Ellie, followed by Julie. Unknown to him at this point, his car is being stolen. Outside they notice Boyd and flee to a nearby motel. Just after Al leaves to search for his car, Boyd arrives at the motel, taking the women back to Mojave and locking them in a shed.

Al and actor buddy Sal mount a rescue mission but are themselves knocked out by Boyd. Kaiser, still alive, arrives at Mojave unseen as Boyd drives off with Al, Sal, Julie and Ellie in the car atop his truck, intending on tipping the car and passengers over the edge of a quarry. They eventually escape uninjured while Boyd plummets to his doom, signaled by an ostentatious explosion.

Ellie returns to Los Angeles with Sal, while Al remains for the night, at least, with Julie.

Cast
Danny Aiello - Al McCord
Angelina Jolie - Ellie Rigby
Anne Archer - Julie, Ellie's mother
Michael Biehn - Boyd, Julie's boyfriend
Alfred Molina - Sal Santori
Jack Noseworthy - Kaiser, Ellie's boyfriend
Zack Norman - Terry
Michael Massee as the Fifth Guy
Peter MacNicol as Tire Repairman

References

External links

1996 films
1996 romantic comedy films
American romantic comedy films
Films directed by Kevin Dowling
Films shot in the Mojave Desert
1990s English-language films
1990s American films